Gamestorming is a set of practices for facilitating innovation in the business world.  A facilitator leads a group towards some goal by way of a game, a structured activity that provides scope for thinking freely, even playfully.

The word gamestorming itself, as a neologism, is a portmanteau suggestive of using games for brainstorming.

A game may be thought of as an alternative to the standard business meeting.  Most games involve 3 to 20 people and last from 15 minutes to an hour and a half. A game suspends some of the usual protocols of life and replaces them with a new set of rules for interaction.  Games may require a few props such as sticky notes, poster paper, markers, random pictures from magazines, or thought provoking objects.  Gamestorming skills include asking questions (opening, navigating, examining, experimenting, closing), structuring large diagrams, sketching ideas, fusing words and pictures into visual language, and most importantly, improvising to choose and lead a suitable game or invent a new one.

The Gamestorming book is used in classes on interactive design and user experience, and social media marketing and referenced in innovation, product development, visual note taking and self-realization.

Origins of games

The gamestorming culture originated in the 1970s in Silicon Valley.  Some of the games have earlier roots, for example, Button is inspired by the Native American Talking Stick tradition, and Show and Tell is known from elementary school.

See also

Business game
Creativity technique
Facilitation (business)
Finite and infinite games
Game § Business games
Innovation game
Open innovation
Serious game
Seven Management and Planning Tools
Team building
Technological innovation system
User experience design

References

Innovation